The Yamaha RD250  is a  two-stroke motorcycle produced by Yamaha Motor Corporation between 1973 and 1987.

Four generations of RD (also known as the RZ250 in the Japanese and Australian markets) were produced: the air-cooled models from 1973 up to 1979, and from 1980 until 1987 the liquid cooled models; known as the RD250LC, RD250LC-II and RD250 YPVS. The name RD stood for Race Developed.

The standard bike weighed 152 kg dry and had a 247cc 2-stroke twin engine that produced 30 hp. It had a 6 speed gearbox and chain final drive.

In 1983 the UK government reduced the maximum cc for learners to 125, killing off the 250 cc motorcycle class in a stroke. At the time, it was considered that the reason for the sudden change in the law was the RD250 which put a high-speed vehicle into the hands of inexperienced users.

References

RD250
Two-stroke motorcycles
Motorcycles introduced in 1973